This is an incomplete list of New York State Historic Markers in Suffolk County, New York.  There are approximately 110 historic markers in the county.

Listings county-wide

Babylon

Brookhaven

East Hampton

Huntington

Islip

Southold

Smithtown

See also
List of New York State Historic Markers
National Register of Historic Places listings in New York
List of National Historic Landmarks in New York

References

External links
Historical Society of Islip Hamlet (Markers)
Long Island Motor Parkway marker (Doug Kerr; Flickr)
Huntington Historical Markers
Suffolk County, New York (Historical Marker Database)

Suffolk County, New York
Suffolk